"Country Gardens" is regarded as an old English folk tune traditionally used for Morris dancing, but it is unlikely to be of folk origin as it was first composed for an opera. It was introduced by traditional folk musician William Kimber to Cecil Sharp near the beginning of the twentieth century, then popularised by a diverse range of musicians from Percy Grainger to Jimmie Rodgers.

History as a folk tune
"Country Gardens" can be dated as far back as 1728, when a version using a very similar tune to the now popular version appeared in Thomas Walker's Quaker's Opera, written as a parody of The Beggar's Opera by John Gay.

The tune was collected by Cecil Sharp from the playing of William Kimber; Sharp transcribed the song from Kimber's playing in 1906, and his transcription can be viewed online via the Vaughan Williams Memorial Library. Kimber, who was later recorded playing the tune on concertina in London in 1948, had performed it in the same way for Morris Dancers in the nineteenth century. His version was one of several variants collected from Cotswold villages and used for Morris dances: "Bampton in the Bush" (collected by Roy Dommett from Arnold Woodley); "Field Town" (Leafield collected by Kenworthy Schofield) ; "Headington" (collected by Carey) and "Longborough" (collected by Cecil Sharp and Schofield).

Percy Grainger 
The Australian composer and folklorist Percy Grainger helped popularise the tune when he arranged it for piano in 1918. Grainger seemed to have become bored with the tune when he re-orchestrated the piece later in life with intentional "wrong" notes, and remarked: 
 The typical English country garden is not often used to grow flowers in; it is more likely to be a vegetable plot. So you can think of turnips as I play it.
Despite its simplistic nature, it is arguably Grainger's most well-known work; because of this, "Country Gardens" was added to the Australian National Film and Sound Archive's Sounds of Australia registry in 2008. The tune and the Grainger arrangement for piano and orchestra remains a favourite with school orchestras.

Popular versions and parodies
The eighteenth century satirical song "The Vicar of Bray" is based on the "Country Gardens" tune.

Pop singer Jimmie F. Rodgers sang a version ("English Country Garden"), which reached Number 5 in the UK Singles Chart in June 1962.

Anglo-Australian comedian, Rolf Harris, recorded a parody of the Rodgers version in the 1970s.

Comedian Allan Sherman used this melody as the tune for his 1963 song, "Here's to the Crabgrass".

The American jazz musician Charlie Parker and his collaborators, frequently ended a number with a brief snatch of it.

The video game Weird Dreams uses the song while the player is in an area called "Country Garden".

Jeff Minter's computer game Hover Bovver repeats a version of "Country Gardens" as background music as the player absconds with their neighbour's lawn mower and proceeds to wreak havoc across different lawns.

Danish musician Kim Larsen wrote a Danish text to the tune called "Kongens have" (Literally: "The King's Garden", which is the most often used Danish name for Rosenborg Castle Gardens). This song is however more often associated with another Danish musician, Flemming Jørgensen, who also recorded a version of the song.

See also
 Radio 4 UK Theme

References

External links
 
 Recording by the United States Marine Band (Arrangement by John Philip Sousa Based on Grainger's Version)

English folk music
18th-century songs
Compositions by Percy Grainger
Year of song unknown